Spirkin Oseredok Island is a low, flat island in the Caspian Sea. It is located east of the mouths of the Volga.

Spirkin Oseredok is separated from the Kazakh coast by a 700 m wide channel. It has a length of 5.2 km and a maximum width of 3.9 km. 

Administratively, Spirkin Oseredok Island belongs to Atyrau Region of Kazakhstan.

Zhanbay Aral, one of the largest islands in the area, lies 10 km to the south southwest beyond a headland.

References

External links
Caspian Sea Biodiversity Project

Islands of the Caspian Sea
Islands of Kazakhstan
Atyrau Region